West Columbia is a city in Brazoria County in the U.S. state of Texas. The population was 3,644 at the 2020 census.

The 1st Congress of the Republic of Texas was convened in West Columbia on October 3, 1836. (It was then named simply Columbia.)

Geography

Texas State Highway 35 leads east  to Angleton, the county seat, and southwest  to Bay City. Texas Highway 36 leads north  to Rosenberg and southeast  to Freeport on the Gulf of Mexico.

Demographics

As of the 2020 United States census, there were 3,644 people, 1,398 households, and 984 families residing in the city.

As of the census of 2000, there were 4,255 people, 1,607 households, and 1,099 families residing in the city. The population density was 1,661.9 people per square mile (641.7/km). There were 1,755 housing units at an average density of 685.5 per square mile (264.7/km). The racial makeup of the city was 70.15% White, 19.51% African American, 0.40% Native American, 0.38% Asian, 0.02% Pacific Islander, 7.83% from other races, and 1.72% from two or more races. Hispanic or Latino of any race were 18.05% of the population.

There were 1,607 households, out of which 35.5% had children under the age of 18 living with them, 50.0% were married couples living together, 14.0% had a female householder with no husband present, and 31.6% were non-families. 27.6% of all households were made up of individuals, and 13.3% had someone living alone who was 65 years of age or older. The average household size was 2.60 and the average family size was 3.19.

In the city, the population was spread out, with 28.8% under the age of 18, 9.0% from 18 to 24, 27.3% from 25 to 44, 21.8% from 45 to 64, and 13.1% who were 65 years of age or older. The median age was 35 years. For every 100 females, there were 88.9 males. For every 100 females age 18 and over, there were 85.0 males.

The median income for a household in the city was $31,115, and the median income for a family was $38,090. Males had a median income of $37,981 versus $19,775 for females. The per capita income for the city was $15,647. About 14.0% of families and 20.0% of the population were below the poverty line, including 24.5% of those under age 18 and 14.3% of those age 65 or over.

History
Columbia was established in 1826 by Josiah Hughes Bell when the town was laid out two miles west of Marion, later known as East Columbia. Columbia was briefly the capital of the Republic of Texas from September to December 1836. The town hosted the First Congress of the Republic of Texas when Sam Houston became president on October 22, 1836. The House of Representatives and Senate each met in private homes. The First Congress voted to move the capital to Houston on November 30 because Columbia lacked living quarters for government officials. On December 27, 1836, Stephen F. Austin died at the home of George B. McKinstry in Columbia.

The town, which became known as West Columbia, saw its commerce decline after the government moved away. A post office was set up in 1905. When oil was discovered in the West Columbia oil field in 1918, the town became a center for cotton, oil, rice and sulphur. By 1928, the town's population rose to 2,500, but the ill-effects of the Great Depression caused the number of residents to fall to about 1,000. In 1940 there were 1,573 persons living in West Columbia and 50 businesses. During the 1950s, the population increased to 2,100. By the 1960s big oil companies had a considerable presence near town and the area boasted the most cattle in the state. In 1960 West Columbia had 2,947 residents, in 1970 it had 3,335 and in 1990 it had 4,372. In the next two decades the population dipped slightly. Varner-Hogg Plantation State Historic Site is near West Columbia.

Government and infrastructure
The United States Postal Service West Columbia Post Office is located at 350 West Brazos Avenue.

West Columbia is a General Law municipality, like approximately 75% of Texas cities. As a "general law" city, West Columbia must operate according
to specific state statutes prescribing powers and duties. City Council is composed of five Council members and a Mayor, elected at-large to two (2) year terms in nonpartisan elections. The day-to-day operation of West Columbia falls to a full-time City Manager.

Economy
Within West Columbia City limits, Columbia-Brazoria ISD, Wal-Mart, HEB, CVS, and Walgreens are major employers. The proximity to major cities allows many residents to commute to oil and gas industry work in nearby cities, and to Houston.

Education 
The city is served by the Columbia-Brazoria Independent School District.

Schools that serve the city include West Columbia Elementary School, Barrow Elementary School, Wild Peach Elementary School, West Brazos Junior High School, and Columbia High School. One elementary and the high school are in West Columbia. The junior high and Barrow Elementary are located in Brazoria.

There is a charter school called West Columbia Charter School.

The West Columbia Library is a part of the Brazoria County Library System.

The Texas Legislature assigned the area in Columbia-Brazoria ISD (including West Columbia) to the Brazosport College district.

Health services 
West Columbia is served by Central EMS. There is not a hospital within the city limits. However, Sweeny Community Hospital, Brazosport Regional, Angleton-Danbury Medical Center and Matagorda Regional are all within a 30-mile radius.

See also

 Varner–Hogg Plantation State Historical Site

References

External links
 City of West Columbia official website
 A photo album of West Columbia
 Columbia Archives
 First Capitol Replica

 
Cities in Brazoria County, Texas
Cities in Texas
Capitals of former nations
Texas
Greater Houston